Khaled Mazgouti (born 27 November 1994) is a French footballer who plays for RCO Agde as a midfielder.

Professional career
Mazgouti made his professional debut for AS Béziers in a 2–1 Ligue 2 loss to US Orléans on 21 December 2018.

References

External links
 Soccerway Profile
 LFP Profile
 Foot Occitanie Profile

1994 births
Living people
French footballers
French sportspeople of Algerian descent
AS Béziers (2007) players
FC Sète 34 players
RCO Agde players
Ligue 2 players
Association football midfielders